Eshki (also Romanized as Eshkī; also known as Eshkeh) is a village in Khaneh Shur Rural District, in the Central District of Salas-e Babajani County, Kermanshah Province, Iran. At the 2006 census, its population was 101, in 24 families.

References 

Populated places in Salas-e Babajani County